Little Einsteins is an American animated children's television series based on the Baby Einstein line of videos. It was produced by The Baby Einstein Company (which, at the time, was owned by Disney) and animated by Curious Pictures. The series marked the Baby Einstein Company's first project for preschoolers. The series follows the adventures of a group of four young children who travel around the world in their friend Rocket and go on missions. The group must work together to achieve their goal by solving a problem, helping someone, or finding something.

The series was first announced in November 2001, when Disney purchased The Baby Einstein Company. Press releases said "there are already plans to extend the Baby Einstein brand into a Little Einstein product line aimed at preschoolers." The show's concept and characters were developed by Douglas Wood. Further development was led by Emmy Award-winning director Olexa Hewryk and Dora the Explorer co-creator Eric Weiner. Like the original Baby Einstein series, Little Einsteins makes heavy use of classical music. According to Common Sense Media, both series share the same "philosophy of artistic visuals and stimulating classical music to enhance brain development and learning."

Little Einsteins started out with a direct-to-video film, Our Huge Adventure, that was released on August 23, 2005. The full series premiered on Playhouse Disney on October 9, 2005, and concluded on December 22, 2009, after two seasons and 67 episodes.

Overview
Little Einsteins was designed to teach the target demographic art and music appreciation by integrating famous or culturally significant art works (usually, but not exclusively, paintings) and classical music (most typically from the Baroque, Classical, and Romantic eras) into the scenery, plot and soundtrack of each episode.

The show is also designed to encourage viewer interaction (such as encouraging the audience to pat their knees, gesture or sing along to help the characters succeed on their "mission").

Episodes

Characters

Main
 Leo (voiced by Jesse Schwartz in the US, singing voice provided by Harrison Chad and Piers Stubbs in the UK) is a 6-year-old boy who is Annie's older brother and the largest member of the group. He is the leader of the Little Einsteins and pilots Rocket. His main talent is conducting, and his most prized possession is his conductor's baton. He has tan skin, red hair and green eyes, and wears green glasses, a black shirt with an orange stripe, orange cargo shorts, white socks, and orange, black and white sneakers.
 June (voiced by Erica Huang in the US and Poppy Friar in the UK) is a 6-year-old Chinese-American ballerina who loves to dance. She has pale skin, short dark brown hair and brown eyes. She wears a pink headband, a purple dress with a pink belt, light blue pearl earrings and crimson ballet slippers but within white socks in the Season 2 episode "Show and Tell".
 Quincy (voiced by Aiden Pompey in the US and Mitchell Zhangazgha in the UK) is a 5-year-old African-American musician who plays a variety of instruments, including the violin, flute, and trumpet. At some point in most episodes, Quincy exclaims, "I cannot believe it!" when surprised or amazed. He has brown skin, dark brown curly hair and brown eyes. He wears a red and blue baseball cap, a yellow shirt with green long sleeves, blue jeans, and red and white shoes.
 Annie (voiced by Natalia Wojcik in the US and Kirsty Hickey in the UK) is a 4-year-old girl who is Leo's younger sister and the smallest member of the team group. She is a young singer who loves to sing and the only character who has piloted Rocket alone. She likes singing and animals, including dolphins and horses, but has arachnophobia. In Season 1, Annie's singing posture is with one hand up in the air and the other hand on her chest, then she comes to own a silver microphone white a purple speaker and orange musical notes after winning it in a singing contest in the Season 2 episode "Annie, Get Your Microphone!" When she wishes to urgently point something out to the team or when she is surprised or amazed, her usual phrase is "Look, look, look!" She has fair skin, blonde hair tied into two pigtails with held by her pink hair bows and blue eyes. In Season 1, she wears a green t-shirt, a blue overall dress, and magenta and white shoes. In Season 2, her outfit is changed to a pale blue blouse, a pink overall dress, white socks, and blue and white shoes.
 Rocket is the Little Einsteins' main mode of transportation, as well as their friend. He has an array of tools and accessories that help the team complete their missions. He also has the ability to transform into any other form of transportation, like a submarine or a train. He communicates by making marimba noises. He is capable of going to outer space.

Recurring
 Big Jet is a blue fighter plane which appears to resemble a Soviet MiG-29. Big Jet has been known to ruin parties and steal things to keep for himself. Big Jet hates springtime, owing to his being allergic to flowers, as seen in the episode "Oh Yes, Oh Yes, It's Springtime". He also hates losing, as seen in "The Great Sky Race Rematch". In the episode, "Show and Tell", Big Jet gets revenge on Rocket and the Little Einsteins for defeating him in all of his appearances by stealing their favorite things. He befriends them later, however.
 Little Mouse, The Good Knight, and Joey the Kangaroo appeared individually in their own episodes, "The Mouse and The Moon", "The Good Knight and The Bad Knight", and "Jump For Joey", respectively, and collectively in the three episodes' crossover-sequel, "Rocket Soup".
 The Three Little Pigs appeared in three episodes: "Farmer Annie", "Super Fast", and "Build It Rocket".
 Melody is a musical pet that Leo helped find her ticket for the pet train in "Melody the Music Pet". After boarding the train, Melody is brought to live with Leo. She reappeared in "Melody and Me", where Leo must save her after her hot air balloon flies away.
 The Bad Knight is the knight who imprisoned the Good Knight. In the episode "The Good Knight and The Bad Knight" he rides a cello that acts like a horse. At the end of the episode, it is revealed that he was under a magic spell that made him a bad knight. after rescuing the Good Knight, he himself transforms back into a good knight. In the episode "Rocket Soup," he helps the Little Einsteins get peas to make Rocket Soup for Rocket to eat.
 The Little Red Train is a good friend of Annie, and despite his small size, he is very determined and very strong. He appeared in the episodes "Go West, Young Train" and "Annie, Get Your Microphone!".

Others
 Ring only appeared in the episode "Ring Around the Planet" when it fell off Saturn and landed near June's garden. Ring is also a great dancer just like June which makes them and the rest of the Little Einsteins friends, with the team bringing it back home to Saturn.
 Grandma Rocket only appeared in the episode "Little Red Rockethood" and is the grandmother of Rocket. She shares a similar appearance to Rocket but is purple and has glasses and gray hair. Just like Rocket, she communicates by marimba sounds.

Broadcast
The first regular episode of Little Einsteins premiered in the US on October 9, 2005. The final regular episode aired (in the US) on December 22, 2009, and a standalone special titled "Rocket's Firebird Rescue" was released on June 19, 2010, marking the series' official end. The series continued to air in reruns afterward, including after Playhouse Disney was rebranded as Disney Junior on February 14, 2011, through March 25, 2019. Later, this show was added to Disney+.

Production
In the UK version, the Little Einsteins are voiced by Poppy Lee Friar (June), Piers Stubbs (Leo), Kirsty Hickey (Annie), and Mitchell Zhangazha (Quincy), and certain American terms are converted to the British vernacular: for example, changing mentions of "Candy Canes" to mentions of "Sweetie Sticks."

Additional home and streaming media

The series also had two VHS releases, one being a VHS version of Our Huge Adventure and the second being Climb Aboard and Get Ready to Explore which included the episodes "The Birthday Balloons", "Dragon Kite" and "Ring Around the Planet". The Halloween special is a bonus feature on the Mickey Mouse Clubhouse DVD Mickey's Treat.

Reception
The series was given a 5-star rating by Common Sense Media.

In other media
A video game based on the show was released for the Game Boy Advance in 2006.

Notes

References

External links
 
 

2005 American television series debuts
2009 American television series endings
2000s American animated television series
American preschool education television series
American children's animated adventure television series
American children's animated musical television series
American children's animated science fantasy television series
American children's animated comic science fiction television series
American flash animated television series
American television series with live action and animation
Animated preschool education television series
2000s preschool education television series
Animated television series about children
Animated television series about siblings
Cultural depictions of Albert Einstein
Disney animated television series
Disney Channel original programming
English-language television shows
Television series by Curious Pictures
Television series by Disney
Disney Junior original programming